Katya Crema (born 2 August 1988), often simply known as Kat, is an Australian alpine and ski cross skier from Melbourne. Competing at the 2010 Winter Olympics, she finished fifteenth.  Crema has also skied on the Winter X-Games circuit, making her debut in 2010.

Personal
Nicknamed Kat, Crema was born on 2 August 1988 in Melbourne, Victoria.

Her father was born in Italy but immigrated to Victoria where he went into construction. From 2008, she attended the University of Melbourne, where she studied towards a Bachelor of Environments majoring architecture. She is subsequently completing a Masters of Property.

Skiing
Crema has been affiliated with the Australian Institute of Sport (AIS), the New South Wales Institute of Sport (NSWIS) and the Victorian Institute of Sport (VIS).  She is coached by Matthew Lyons. Her scholarship with the AIS started on 1 July 2008. While at university, she held a High Performance Scholarship for skiing. Her skiing is sponsored by Rip Curl, POC, Komperdell, and Stoekli. Crema is a member of the Mount Buller Race Club. She originally did alpine skiing but switched to ski cross when she was nineteen years old; during the 2007/2008 ski season.

When actively training off the snow, she may do 10 to 12 training sessions a week.  When training on the snow, her on snow training sessions may last up to four hours each with up to six sessions a week. She competed in the 2007 World Junior Alpine Championships held in Flachau, Austria. She competed in the 2009 Freestyle World Championships held in Inawashiro, Japan. Crema competed in the 2009 World Junior Alpine Championships held in Fomigal, Spain. In 2009, she trained with skier Jenny Owens. In January 2010, she finished in 10th position at the Lake Placid World Cup.

Crema participated in the 2010 Vancouver Games in the first Olympic women's ski-cross event, where she finished 15th, being one of two Australian women to compete in this event. She made her Winter X-Games debut in 2010. In 2011, she participated in the AUC Snow Sports competition. She competed in the 2011 Freestyle World Championships in Deer Valley, where she finished 17th. In 2011, her best result was first at the Mount Hotham hosted Australian New Zealand Cup. She competed at the 2012 Les Contamines in France where she finished 7th.

She competed for Australia at the 2014 Winter Olympics in the ski cross events where she finished 7th.

Performances

References

External links
 Official Site

Living people
1988 births
Australian female alpine skiers
Sportswomen from Victoria (Australia)
Australian Institute of Sport alpine skiers
Victorian Institute of Sport alumni
Olympic freestyle skiers of Australia
Freestyle skiers at the 2010 Winter Olympics
Freestyle skiers at the 2014 Winter Olympics
Skiers from Melbourne